The Yamaha NMAX is a scooter produced by Yamaha since 2015. It was officially launched in February 2015 at the Sentul International Circuit in West Java, Indonesia. The scooter's production base is in Indonesia and has been exported to various countries as Yamaha's global scooter model.

Model updates

2017 
In December 2017, Yamaha released a minor change from the NMAX 155 which was marketed as the 2018 model with a number of changes, such as a speedometer design change, the color of the gold wheels for certain color variants, changes in seat design, and the addition of an external oil tank to the rear shock absorbers. This change only applied in Indonesia, whereas for other countries it was still the same as before.

2019 
In December 2019, Yamaha issued a major change from the NMAX 155 which was marketed as the 2020 model.

Engines and specifications

References

External links 
 (Japan)*  (Japan)

NMAX
Motor scooters
Motorcycles introduced in 2015